The Bayfield 40 is a Canadian sailboat that was designed by Ted Gozzard for cruising and first built in 1982.

Production
The design was built by Bayfield Boat Yard in Clinton, Ontario, Canada, starting in 1984, but the company went out of business in 1988 after a factory fire and production ended then.

Design
The Bayfield 40 is a recreational keelboat, built predominantly of balsa-cored fibreglass, with wood trim. It has a staysail ketch rig, with aluminum spars, a clipper bow with a bowsprit and trailboards, a raised counter transom, a keel-mounted rudder controlled by a wheel and a fixed long keel. It displaces  and carries  of lead ballast.

The design has sleeping accommodation for six people, with two double berths aft with optional raisable privacy panels in between and a "U"-shaped settee in the main cabin with a drop-down table that converts to a double berth. The galley is located on the port side forward. The galley is "U"-shaped and is equipped with a two-burner propane-fired stove, an electric refrigerator and a sink. A navigation station is aft of the galley, on the port side. The head is located just aft of the forepeak and includes a shower. The forepeak houses sail lockers and the anchor locker, accessible from the deck above.

Ventilation is provided by a port and hatch each in the aft cabins, plus two forward opening hatches and two opening ports in the head. There is a total of ten opening ports and four opening hatches, plus a large opening skylight just aft of the main mast.

For sailing the design is equipped with a total of 11 winches for the halyards and the sheets.

Operational history
In a 1994 review of the Bayfield 40, Richard Sherwood wrote, "the lines of the hull are traditional. The foresail rig is unusual in a big ketch. Cabin layout, with a midships galley and no vee berths, is distinctly different."

See also
List of sailing boat types

Similar sailboats
Baltic 40
Bermuda 40
Bristol 40
Caliber 40
Dickerson 41
Endeavour 40
Islander 40
Lord Nelson 41
Nordic 40

References

Keelboats
1980s sailboat type designs
Sailing yachts
Sailboat type designs by Ted Gozzard
Sailboat types built by Bayfield Boat Yard